Alex DeCroce (June 10, 1936 – January 9, 2012) was an American Republican Party politician who served in the New Jersey General Assembly, where he represented the 26th Legislative District from 1989 until his death.

He was the Assembly's Republican Leader since 2003, served as the Republican Conference Leader from 2002 to 2003, and was the Deputy Speaker from 1994 to 2001. DeCroce served in the Assembly on the Legislative Services Commission.

DeCroce served on the Morris County Board of Chosen Freeholders from 1984 to 1989 and as the Freeholder Director in 1986.

DeCroce was born in Morristown and attended Boonton High School and Seton Hall University. He resided in Parsippany-Troy Hills.

Death
DeCroce died on January 9, 2012, after collapsing in a bathroom inside the Statehouse, just moments after the 214th Legislature held its final voting session.  He was 75. On January 25, 2012, his widow, BettyLou DeCroce, was selected by the Morris County Republican Committee to replace him in the Assembly until a November 2012 special election was held. She won the special election to fill the remainder of his unexpired term, and has since been reelected four times in her own right.

References

External links
Assemblyman DeCroce's legislative web page, New Jersey Legislature
New Jersey Legislature financial disclosure forms
2010 2009 2008 2007 2006 2005 2004
Assembly Member Alex DeCroce, Project Vote Smart
New Jersey Voter Information Website for 2003

1936 births
2012 deaths
American people of Italian descent
Boonton High School alumni
Republican Party members of the New Jersey General Assembly
County commissioners in New Jersey
People from Morristown, New Jersey
People from Parsippany-Troy Hills, New Jersey
Seton Hall University alumni
21st-century American politicians